The 1997 San Jose State Spartans football team represented San Jose State University during the 1997 NCAA Division I-A football season as a member of the Western Athletic Conference. The team was led by head coach Dave Baldwin, in his first year as head coach at San Jose State. They played home games at Spartan Stadium in San Jose, California. The Spartans finished the 1997 season with a record of four wins and seven losses (4–7, 4–4 WAC).

Schedule

Game Summaries

at No. 17 Stanford

Wisconsin

at Wyoming

at Oregon State

Colorado State

at UTEP

Air Force

Fresno State

at San Diego State

Hawaii

at UNLV

Team players in the NFL
No San Jose State Spartans were selected in the 1998 NFL Draft.

Notes

References

San Jose State
San Jose State Spartans football seasons
San Jose State Spartans football